Harold Arthur Lee-Dillon, 17th Viscount Dillon CH FBA (24 January 1844–18 December 1932) was an English antiquary and a leading authority on the history of arms and armour and medieval costume.

Life
The eldest son of Arthur Dillon, 16th Viscount Dillon, he was born in Victoria Square, Westminster, and educated at private school and at the University of Bonn, Germany. He purchased an Ensigncy in the Rifle Brigade in 1862 and a Lieutenancy in 1866. He served in India and Canada, but resigned his commission in 1874. He then joined the Oxfordshire Militia (later the 4th (Militia) Battalion, Oxfordshire Light Infantry) as a Captain. He was promoted Major in 1885 and retired in 1891. He succeeded his father as The 17th Viscount Dillon in 1892.

After leaving the regular army he devoted himself to antiquarian study, writing over fifty books and articles. He was chairman of the trustees of the National Portrait Gallery from 1894 to 1928. In the first year, his portrait was painted by Georgina Brackenbury. He bequeathed to the trustees various portraits from Ditchley Park, Charlbury including the portrait of his ancestor Sir Henry Lee by Antonio Moro. He served as Curator of the Royal Armouries from 1892 to 1913.

He was President of the Royal Archaeological Institute from 1892 to 1898 and President of the Society of Antiquaries of London from 1897 to 1904. He was the founding president of the Society for Army Historical Research holding the position until his death. He was elected a founding Fellow of the British Academy in 1902. He was also appointed antiquary to the Royal Academy.

He was appointed to the Order of the Companions of Honour (CH) in the 1921 Birthday Honours for his work with the National Portrait Gallery.

His only son predeceased him and he was succeeded by his nephew, Arthur.

Ancestry

Footnotes

References
Biography, Oxford Dictionary of National Biography

1844 births
1932 deaths
People from Westminster
University of Bonn alumni
Members of the Order of the Companions of Honour
Fellows of the British Academy
Fellows of the Society of Antiquaries of London
Presidents of the Society of Antiquaries of London
English antiquarians
English curators
Rifle Brigade officers
Oxfordshire and Buckinghamshire Light Infantry officers
British Militia officers
Earls in the Jacobite peerage
Trustees of the National Portrait Gallery
Harold
People of the Royal Commission on the Historical Monuments of England
Presidents of the Royal Archaeological Institute
Historians of weapons